Jim Irish (born 1941 in Waterford, Ireland) is an Irish retired sportsperson.  He played hurling with his local club Erin's Own and was a member of the Waterford senior inter-county team in the 1960s.

References

1941 births
Living people
Erin's Own (Waterford) hurlers
Waterford inter-county hurlers